Saijō Saijo or Saijou  (written:  or ) is a Japanese surname. Notable people with the surname include:

Albert Saijo (1926–2011), Japanese-American poet
, Japanese singer and television personality
, Japanese boxer

Japanese-language surnames